48 Cassiopeiae is a triple star system in the northern constellation of Cassiopeia. It is visible to the naked eye with a combined apparent visual magnitude of 4.49. The system is moving closer with a heliocentric radial velocity of −12.4 km/s.

The primary component, designated 48 Cassiopeiae A, is a white A-type main-sequence star with a stellar classification of A2 V and an apparent magnitude of +4.65. It has a companion, component B, which is an F-type main-sequence star of class F2 V and an apparent magnitude of +6.74. This pair orbit around their common centre of mass once every 61.1 years. They have a semimajor axis of 0.614 arcseconds and an eccentricity of 0.355. A third companion, component C, is a magnitude 13.20 star located at an angular separation of 23.16 arcseconds as of 2014, or at least 816.5 AU away.

48 Cassiopeiae also has the Bayer designation A Cassiopeiae, the only star with a Latin letter designation in the constellation.

References

A-type subgiants
F-type main-sequence stars
Spectroscopic binaries
4
Cassiopeia (constellation)
Cassiopeiae, A
BD+70 0153
Cassiopeiae, 48
012111
009480
0575